Emmanuel Earl Callender (sometimes Callander; born 10 May 1984 in Arouca, Trinidad and Tobago) is a track and field sprint athlete, who competes internationally for Trinidad and Tobago.

Callender represented Trinidad and Tobago at the 2008 Summer Olympics in Beijing. He competed at the 4 × 100 m relay, together with Marc Burns, Aaron Armstrong, Keston Bledman and Richard Thompson. In their qualification heat (without Callender) they placed first in front of Japan, the Netherlands and Brazil. Their time of 38.26 was the fastest of all sixteen teams participating in the first round and they qualified for the final. Armstrong was replaced by Callender for the final race and they sprinted to a time of 38.06 seconds, the second fastest time after the Jamaican team, winning the silver medal.

At the 2012 Summer Olympics, he raced in the first round and the final, and Trinidad and Tobago won the silver medal.

Callender set new personal bests in the 100 and 200 meters at the Grande Prêmio Brasil Caixa meet in May 2009, recording times of 10.16 and 20.40 seconds respectively. Since then, he has improved his 100 m personal best, to 10.05 s.

Personal bests
100 m: 10.05 s (wind: +0.4 m/s) –  Zürich, 28 August 2009
200 m: 20.40 s (wind: +0.3 m/s) –  Belém, 24 May 2009
400 m: 48.47 s –  Kingston, 26 January 2008

International competitions

†: Disqualified in the final.
‡: Did not finish in the final.
*: Disqualified in the semifinal.

References

1984 births
Living people
Trinidad and Tobago male sprinters
Olympic athletes of Trinidad and Tobago
Athletes (track and field) at the 2008 Summer Olympics
Athletes (track and field) at the 2012 Summer Olympics
Athletes (track and field) at the 2016 Summer Olympics
Athletes (track and field) at the 2011 Pan American Games
Athletes (track and field) at the 2010 Commonwealth Games
Olympic silver medalists for Trinidad and Tobago
Pan American Games medalists in athletics (track and field)
World Athletics Championships medalists
Medalists at the 2012 Summer Olympics
Medalists at the 2008 Summer Olympics
People from Tunapuna–Piarco
Pan American Games bronze medalists for Trinidad and Tobago
Olympic silver medalists in athletics (track and field)
World Athletics Championships athletes for Trinidad and Tobago
Central American and Caribbean Games gold medalists for Trinidad and Tobago
Competitors at the 2010 Central American and Caribbean Games
Competitors at the 2014 Central American and Caribbean Games
Olympic gold medalists for Trinidad and Tobago
Central American and Caribbean Games medalists in athletics
Medalists at the 2011 Pan American Games
Commonwealth Games competitors for Trinidad and Tobago